Mickisha Hazelle Hurley (born March 6, 1975) is a former indoor volleyball player. She played for the United States national team at the 2000 Summer Olympics.

References

Olympic volleyball players of the United States
Volleyball players at the 2000 Summer Olympics
Sportspeople from Florida
1975 births
Living people
American women's volleyball players
21st-century American women
Pan American Games medalists in volleyball
Pan American Games bronze medalists for the United States
Medalists at the 1999 Pan American Games